The following is a list of current commercial operators of the Airbus A350.

Airline operators
There were 436 A350 aircraft in service with 33 operators . The largest operators are Singapore Airlines (61), Qatar Airways (53), Cathay Pacific (42), Delta Air Lines (28), Lufthansa (21) and other airlines operating fewer of the type.

See also
List of Airbus A330 operators
List of Boeing 787 operators

References

Airbus A350